The St. Louis Sentinel is an African-American-oriented weekly newspaper, founded in 1968 by Howard B. Woods in St. Louis, Missouri. After Woods's death in 1976, his wife Jane Woods took over as publisher.

See also

African American newspapers
St. Louis American
St. Louis Argus
Suburban Journals

References

African-American history in St. Louis
Saint Louis Sentinel
St. Louis Sentinel